The 2011–12 season of the FA Women's Premier League is the 20th season of the former top flight of English women's association football. The league grew to ten teams this season, with two teams being relegated and four being promoted from the Northern and Southern divisions.

National Division

Results
Teams play each other twice, once at home, once away

Northern Division

Southern Division

Northern Combination Women's Football League

Midland Combination Women's Football League

References

She Kicks article on league constitution
Official website

External links
Season on soccerway.com

Eng
women
FA Women's National League seasons
2